Waughton Castle is a ruined castle, dating from the fourteenth century, about  north of East Linton, and  west of Whitekirk in East Lothian, Scotland. It is a scheduled monument.

Structure

Waughton Castle was a castle with a courtyard, but only part of one wing remains. The ruins are on a rock terrace, which is about 15 feet higher than the surrounding ground to the west and south.  The remains of a small tower, at the south-west angle, and which is built of rubble with freestone dressing, stand up to 25 feet in height.  Features of a narrow window in the south wall suggest that this is a 16th-century structure.  A wall has been built to east and north of the rock, with a structure at the angle, but they are believed to date from later. There is a partially artificial stairway up the rock.  There is a doocot in the grounds.

History

There is a mention of a hall at ‘Walchtoun’ in a document from 1395.  The castle was the property of the Hepburn family.  It was sacked by the English in 1547. In January 1570, when it was in the keeping of the Laird of Carmichael, the castle was raided by a dispossessed Hepburn. The Hepburns acquired the castle again by legal means, and retained it until Alexander Cockburn purchased the castle from John Hepburn.  By the 18th century the castle was being used as material for building walls and cottages in the area.

James VI made a hunting trip to the area in February 1595, planning to visit Dunglass, Spott, Beil, Waughton, and Seton.

References

External links

 Reconstruction of Waughton Castle http://www.maybole.org/history/castles/garleton.htm

Castles in East Lothian
Ruined castles in Scotland
Scheduled Ancient Monuments in East Lothian